Opam or OPAM may refer to:

Opam
Emmanuel Opam-Brown Akolbire (born 1960), Ghanaian politician and member of Ghanaian Parliament

OPAM
 OCaml Package Manager, for the Caml programming language implementation
 Ōita Prefectural Art Museum (OpAm), an art museum and community exhibition venue in Japan
 OPAM, a sculpture park by Lucien den Arend